Michael Peter Huerta (born November 18, 1956) is an American government official who served as Administrator of the Federal Aviation Administration from 2013 to 2018. He was also Acting U.S. Secretary of Transportation under President Donald Trump for 11 days in 2017 until the Senate confirmed the appointment of Elaine Chao to the position.

Career
Huerta received his bachelor's degree in political science from the University of California, Riverside and his master's in international relations from the Woodrow Wilson School of Public and International Affairs at Princeton University.

Huerta was commissioner of New York City's Department of Ports, International Trade and Commerce from 1986 to 1989 before leaving to serve as Executive Director of the Port of San Francisco until 1993. From 1993 to 1998 he held senior positions at the United States Department of Transportation in Washington, D.C., serving under Secretaries Federico Peña and Rodney E. Slater during the Administration of President Bill Clinton.

Huerta was a Managing Director with the Salt Lake Organizing Committee for the 2002 Olympic Winter Games, preparing Salt Lake City's transportation outlets for the Olympics, and organizing the logistics for the Olympic flame for its journey from Athens, Greece to Salt Lake City, Utah.

From 2002 to 2009, Huerta was Group President of the Transportation Solutions Group at Affiliated Computer Services, a company later acquired by Xerox, specializing in business processes and information technology.

Federal Aviation Administration

President Obama nominated Huerta as Deputy Administrator of the Federal Aviation Administration (FAA) on January 26, 2010 and became Deputy Administrator of the FAA five months later.

On December 6, 2011, Huerta became Acting Administrator of the FAA upon the resignation of Randy Babbitt.

On March 27, 2012, President Barack Obama formally nominated him to serve as the next permanent Administrator of the Federal Aviation Administration for a term of five years; the nomination was subsequently confirmed by the U.S. Senate on January 1, 2013.

From January 20 to 31, 2017, Huerta was briefly the Acting Secretary of Transportation.

References

External links

|-

1956 births
Administrators of the Federal Aviation Administration
Commissioners in New York City
Living people
Obama administration personnel
People from Riverside, California
Trump administration cabinet members
University of California, Riverside alumni
Princeton School of Public and International Affairs alumni